Eugene G. Lipov, M.D. (born 1958) is a physician researcher and board-certified anesthesiologist who specializes in intervention-based pain management in the Chicago area.

He is best known for his treatment of post-traumatic stress disorder (PTSD) using the 
stellate ganglion block (SGB). The injection-based technique "seems to 'reboot' the body's sympathetic system and may help to reset a PTSD patient's overreaction to stimuli — their 'fight or flight' response—by resetting the sympathetic nervous system and central nervous system to the pre trauma state..

In 2016, the Pentagon approved funding for a study at three Army medical centers, citing SGB’s potential to be a huge game changer for many affected people with PTSD, whether from combat, sexual assault or other trauma. In 2017, the U.S. Army commissioned the first large-scale randomized trial of the procedure.

Published in 2019, an Army-funded study, conducted by RTI International, confirmed that SGB was more than two times as effective compared to a placebo in relieving PTSD symptoms.

Background 
Born in the Soviet-controlled Ukraine, Lipov and his family emigrated to the United States in 1973. Once settled in Chicago, his father Gregory, a cardiovascular surgeon, and his mother Mary, an endocrinologist, were among the first group of physicians to take care of local Russian émigrés. Both Lipov and his older brother Sergei went on to have careers in medicine as adults.

Education 
A Frances W. Parker School (Chicago) graduate, Lipov received his bachelor's in biochemistry from Northwestern University in 1980. A medical degree from Feinberg School of Medicine followed in 1984, and Lipov moved to Cook County Hospital/University of Illinois for a surgical residency. He spent two years in an anesthesiology residency at the University of Illinois before completing his training at Rush St Luke's with advanced training in pain management.

Pain management research & treatment
Lipov's PTSD research earned him an invitation to testify before the U.S. House Committee on Veteran's Affairs in 2010. His work also garnered references from former Congressman Rahm Emanuel, then Senator Barack Obama, and Senator Richard Durbin, among others. President Obama wrote: "There is a growing body of evidence to suggest that PTSD is afflicting a growing number of our heroic service members. [It] is important to consider any new approaches that may hold potential for helping our service members get the care they need."

Lipov's scholarly research and interests include the development of new approaches for pain conditions, and old approaches for new indications. He has developed a new stimulator approach called the "Hybrid Stimulator" for back and leg pain. He was also the first to report a successful use of stellate ganglion block for hot flashes and PTSD.

Lipov has authored over 40 medical publications, including journal articles, book chapters and abstracts,  as well as two theoretical papers explaining the mechanisms of the effects observed in the controversial and non-peer reviewed journal Medical Hypotheses. His "unified theory" explains the prolonged effects of local anesthetic placed on the stellate ganglion resolving complex regional pain syndrome (CRPS). It also predicts the positive effect of SGB on estrogen depletion, hot flashes, PTSD and other conditions.

Lipov has made numerous media appearances relating to his innovations in the treatment of chronic pain. Many have focused on state-of-the-art disk treatments, implantable neuro-stimulators for lower back pain and treatment of back and leg pain after surgery. His recent focus has been hot flash treatments and PTSD due to the lack of other effective treatments.

Personal life 
Lipov lives with his wife and two sons, one of whom co-authored The Adventures of Captain Heart with him at the age of 4. The book explains how three-to-seven year-olds can maintain a healthy heart.

References

American anesthesiologists
Living people
1958 births
Soviet emigrants to the United States
Feinberg School of Medicine alumni
American pain physicians
Ukrainian emigrants to the United States
Physicians from Chicago